Pennsylvania State Senate District 9 includes parts of Chester County and Delaware County. It is currently represented by Democrat John I. Kane.

District profile
The district includes the following areas:

Chester County

 Avondale
 Birmingham Township
 East Marlborough Township
 Franklin Township
 Kennett Township
 Kennett Square
 London Britain Township
 London Grove Township
 New Garden Township
 Pennsbury Township
 Pocopson Township
 Thornbury Township
 West Grove
 Westtown Township

Delaware County

 Aston Township
 Bethel Township
 Brookhaven
 Chadds Ford Township
 Chester
 Chester Heights
 Chester Township
 Concord Township
 Eddystone
 Edgmont Township
 Lower Chichester Township
 Marcus Hook
 Middletown Township
 Nether Providence Township
 Parkside
 Rose Valley
 Thornbury Township
 Trainer
 Upland
 Upper Chichester Township

Senators

Recent election results

References

Pennsylvania Senate districts
Government of Chester County, Pennsylvania
Government of Delaware County, Pennsylvania